William Middleton (by 1533 – 1574 or later) was an English politician.

He was a Member (MP) of the Parliament of England for Carlisle in 1555.

References

Year of death missing
English MPs 1555
Year of birth uncertain